The Naval War College (NWC or NAVWARCOL) is the staff college and "Home of Thought" for the United States Navy at Naval Station Newport in Newport, Rhode Island. The NWC educates and develops leaders, supports defining the future Navy and associated roles and missions, supports combat readiness, and strengthens global maritime partnerships.

The Naval War College is one of the senior service colleges including the Army War College, the Marine Corps War College, and the USAF Air War College.  Additionally, the U.S. Department of Defense operates the National War College.

History
The college was established on October 6, 1884; its first president, Commodore Stephen B. Luce, was given the old building of the Newport Asylum for the Poor to house it on Coasters Harbor Island in Narragansett Bay.  Among the first four faculty members were Tasker H. Bliss, a future Army Chief of Staff, James R. Soley, the first civilian faculty member and a future Assistant Secretary of the Navy, and, most famously, Captain (later, Rear Admiral) Alfred Thayer Mahan, who soon became renowned for the scope of his strategic thinking and influence on naval leaders worldwide.

The College engaged in wargaming various scenarios from 1887 on, and in time became a laboratory for the development of war plans. Nearly all of the U.S. naval operations of the twentieth century were originally designed and gamed at the NWC.

More than 50,000 students have graduated since its first class of 9 students in 1885 and about 300 of today's active duty admirals, and generals and senior executive service leaders are alumni. The college's joint professional military education (JPME) programs prepare leaders for the challenges of operational and strategic leadership over the remainder of their careers as decision makers and problem solvers. More than 1,900 students have graduated from the Maritime Staff Operators Course, 200 from the Executive Level OLW Course, and more than 450 U.S. and international flag and general officers from the Flag Course. Just as its educational programs have expanded in depth and reach, so have the research and analysis efforts conducted by its Center for Naval Warfare Studies. Through war games, conferences, workshops, and publications, its research arm provides direct curriculum support to its educational programs and focused, task-driven analysis for fleet customers and government agencies across the national security spectrum.

Academic programs

College of Naval Command and Staff
The College of Naval Command and Staff (CNCS) is a multidisciplinary program designed for U.S. Navy and U.S. Coast Guard officers in the grade of lieutenant commander, U.S. Marine Corps, U.S. Army, and U.S. Air Force officers in the grade of major, and civilians of equivalent seniority from various federal agencies. This intermediate level service college course provides an initial opportunity for joint professional military education wherein students prepare for increased responsibilities as commanders / lieutenant colonels, and as junior captains / colonels.

College of Naval Command and Staff students pursue studies in each of the Naval War College's three core subject areas in the following order of presentation: Strategy and War, National Security Decision Making, and Joint Maritime Operations.  While this basic curriculum is essentially the same as that of the more senior students enrolled in the College of Naval Warfare, individual courses are tailored to the experience level and career needs of the CNCS's mid-grade officers.  Each student in the College of Naval Command and Staff is also required to enroll in one Elective Program course of his or her choice per trimester.  A limited number of students may, with selection committee approval, forego up to one trimester of the core curriculum to participate in the Center for Naval Warfare Studies' Advanced Research Program.

Beginning in 1914, NWC imparts its competent, executive-level programs beyond campus through its, now web-based, College of Distance Education (CDE). The three main CDE courses are Strategy and War, Theater Security Decision Making, and Joint Maritime Operations.

Maritime Advanced Warfighting School (MAWS)

Originally established in 1998 as the Naval Operational Planner Course, the Maritime Advanced Warfighting School (MAWS) is a 13-month program that educates U.S. officers of all services to:

 Be operational planners and ultimately, operational leaders 
 Understand and apply maritime power effectively 
 Form and lead Operational Planning Teams (OPTs)  
 Think creatively and critically by developing solutions to complex, chaotic security problems

MAWS integrates the College of Naval Command and Staff core curriculum with specialized education and hands-on, real-world projects in the operational planning domain.  MAWS is the U.S. Navy's peer school to the U.S. Army's School of Advanced Military Studies (SAMS), the U.S. Marine Corps' School of Advanced Warfighting (SAW), the U.S. Air Force's School of Advanced Air and Space Studies (SAASS), and the Joint Forces Staff College's Joint Advanced Warfighting School (JAWS).

College of Naval Warfare
The College of Naval Warfare is a multidisciplinary program designed for U.S. Navy and U.S. Coast Guard officers in the grades of commander or captain, U.S. Marine Corps, U.S. Army and U.S. Air Force officers in the grades of lieutenant colonel or colonel, and civilians of equivalent seniority from various federal agencies. This senior level professional military education program provides students with executive-level preparation for higher responsibilities as senior captains / colonels and as junior flag officers / general officers.

College of Naval Warfare students pursue studies in each of the Naval War College's three core subject areas in the following order of presentation: National Security Decision Making, Strategy and Policy, and Joint Military Operations. During the first two of these trimesters, College of Naval Warfare students will be joined in lectures and in seminars by international students of the Naval Command College. Each College of Naval Warfare student is also required to enroll in one Elective Program course of his or her choice per trimester. A limited number of students in each class may, with selection committee approval, forego up to one trimester of the core curriculum to participate in the Center for Naval Warfare Studies' Advanced Research Program.

Accreditation and degrees
The Naval War College has been accredited by the New England Association of Schools and Colleges since 1984.  Several years later the Naval War College earned the authority to award to students in some of its programs a Master of Arts in National Security and Strategic Studies.  Naval War College students are also permitted to transfer up to 18 credits to the Graduate Program in International Relations at Salve Regina University.  The arrangement allows Naval War College students to complete a Master of Arts degree in International Relations from Salve Regina University by taking six additional courses.

Publications
The Naval War College Press has published the scholarly quarterly journal the Naval War College Review since 1948. It also publishes the "Newport Papers", as well as an historical monograph series and occasional books.

Research and instruction
The Henry E. Eccles Library, housed in Hewitt Hall, supports the Naval War College's mission by providing information literacy training, reference tutorials and assistance, electronic literature searches, and access to over 90 databases, and interlibrary loan services to Professional Military Education/Joint Professional Military Education, faculty research and analysis, and College of Distance Education.

The library also aids curricula development by assisting faculty research, publishing bibliographies and research guides covering a wide range of topics of interest for those studying international relations, foreign area studies, contemporary and historical military topics, and security studies.

The Naval Historical Collection (NHC) is the depository for the Naval War College archives, manuscripts, oral histories, and special collections relating to the history of naval warfare and the history of the U.S. Navy in Narragansett Bay. Established in 1969 and located in Mahan Hall, the NHC's primary source material are of interest to naval historians, scholars, and students of American military and diplomatic history, Naval War College students, faculty and staff, and the general public.

Buildings and structures

Over the years, the Naval War College has expanded greatly. The original building, the former Newport Asylum for the Poor, now serves as home to the Naval War College Museum. In 1892, Luce Hall was opened as the college's new home, at a cost of $100,000. At the time, the building housed lecture rooms and a library. Wings at either end provided two sets of quarters, occupied by the president of the College and members of the faculty. When the Naval War College was enlarged in 1932, this original building was renamed Luce Hall in honor of the institution's founder and first Superintendent (later President), Stephen B. Luce. This original pair of buildings was designated a National Historic Landmark in 1964, and listed on the National Register of Historic Places. Luce Hall was again listed on the National Register in 1972.

Mahan Hall, named after Rear Admiral Alfred Thayer Mahan (NWC President from 1886–1889 and 1892–1893), was completed and opened in 1904, and encompasses the historic Mahan Rotunda and Reading Room, as well as student study areas. The Mahan Rotunda also serves as an impromptu museum of gifts and artifacts donated by graduating international students over the years.

Pringle Hall (named after Vice Admiral Joel R. P. Pringle, Naval War College President from 1927–1930) was opened in 1934, and was the principal site for war gaming from the time of its completion in 1934 until the Naval Electronic Warfare Simulator was built in Sims Hall in 1957. The exterior facing of the building is pink Milford granite, similar in appearance to the ashlar granite of Luce Hall, to which it is connected by two enclosed bridges. Pringle Hall contains a 432-seat auditorium, the Quinn Lecture Room, the Naval Staff College, the Graphic Arts Studio, the Photography Branch, and the Naval War College Press.

In 1947, the Naval War College acquired an existing barracks building and converted it to a secondary war gaming facility, naming it Sims Hall after former War College President Admiral William Sowden Sims (Naval War College President from February to April 1917 and again from 1919–1922). In 1957 Sims Hall became the primary center for the Naval War College's wargaming department, serving as such until 1999. Sims Hall is undergoing renovations that are expected to be completed in 2021.

The 1970s saw the War College's most active expansion, with the opening of three separate buildings. In 1972, Spruance Hall, named after former NWC President Admiral Raymond A. Spruance (March 1946 – July 1948), was completed, housing faculty offices and an 1,100 seat auditorium. On March 17, 1975, Johnny Cash with The Tennessee Three including June Carter Cash and Carl Lee Perkins performed a live concert at Spruance Auditorium.

In 1974, Conolly Hall was opened and named in honor of Admiral Richard L. Conolly, Naval War College President 1950–1953. It houses the NWC Quarterdeck, Administrative and faculty offices, numerous class and conference rooms, and two underground parking garages.

1976 saw the opening of Hewitt Hall, one of two Naval War College buildings not named after a War College president, this time taking its name from Admiral Henry Kent Hewitt, an advisor to the Naval War College during his tenure as Commander, U.S. Naval Forces Europe, following World War II. Hewitt Hall is home to the Henry E. Eccles Library, the Trident Café, the bookstore and barbershop, and student study areas and lounge.

In 1999, the state-of-the-art McCarty Little Hall opened, replacing Sims Hall as the War College's primary wargaming facility. The other building named after a non-president is named after Captain William McCarty Little, an influential leader and key figure in refining the techniques of war gaming. This high-tech facility is used primarily by the Center for Naval Warfare Studies to conduct war games and major conferences, and for research and analysis. The building features the technology necessary to support a variety of multi-media needs essential during multiple and simultaneous war games.

Partnership with Brown University 

On June 6, 2014, NWC and Brown University's Watson Institute for International Studies signed a Research and Education Memorandum of Agreement (MOA) between the two institutions.  The agreement promotes collaborative research and teaching between NWC and Brown, serves as an opportunity to establish and conduct programs to improve education in science-related fields to meet long-term national defense needs, and establishes cooperative education programs for undergraduate education at Brown and postgraduate education at both Brown and NWC.

Notable U.S. graduates

U.S. Navy 
 Admiral Jeremy Michael Boorda, 25th Chief of Naval Operations, 1994–1996
 Admiral William J. Fallon, Commander, U.S. Pacific Command, 2005–2007; Commander, U.S. Central Command, 2007–2008
 Admiral Mark P. Fitzgerald, Commander, U.S. Naval Forces Europe and Allied Joint Force Command Naples, 2007–2010
 Admiral William E. Gortney, Commander, U.S. Fleet Forces Command, 2012–2014; Commander, U.S. Northern Command and Commander, North American Aerospace Defense Command, 2014–2016
 Fleet Admiral William F. Halsey Jr., Commander, 3rd Fleet during World War II 
 Admiral Kent Hewitt, World War II decorated officer (two time recipient of the Navy Cross)
 Fleet Admiral Ernest J. King, first Commander in Chief, United States Fleet and 9th Chief of Naval Operations, 1942–1945
 Admiral George McMillin, 38th and final Naval Governor of Guam, one of the first WWII POWs at First Battle of Guam 1940–1941
 Admiral Thomas H. Moorer, 18th Chief of Naval Operations, 1967–1970; Chairman of the Joint Chiefs of Staff, 1970–1974
 Vice Admiral David C. Nichols Jr., Commander, U.S. Naval Forces Central Command / U.S. Fifth Fleet, 2003–2005; Deputy Commander, U.S. Central Command, 2005–2007
 Fleet Admiral Chester W. Nimitz, CINCPAC 1941–1945, 10th Chief of Naval Operations, 1945–1947 
 Rear Admiral Alan Shepard, first American in space, 1961; fifth man on the Moon, 1971
 Admiral Raymond Spruance, Commander, 5th Fleet during World War II
 Admiral James G. Stavridis, Commander in Chief, Supreme Allied Commander Europe, 2009–2013
 Admiral Elmo Zumwalt, 19th Chief of Naval Operations, 1970–1974
 Commander (ret.) Carlos Del Toro, 78th U.S. Secretary of the Navy, 2021–present

U.S. Coast Guard 
 Admiral Robert E. Kramek, USCG, Commandant of the U.S. Coast Guard, 1990–1994
 Admiral Robert J. Papp Jr., USCG, Commandant of the U.S. Coast Guard, 2010–2014
 Admiral Paul F. Zukunft, USCG, Commandant of the U.S. Coast Guard, 2014–2018

U.S. Marine Corps 
 General Walter Boomer, USMC, Assistant Commandant, U.S. Marine Corps, 1992–1994
 General James E. Cartwright, USMC, Vice Chairman of the Joint Chiefs of Staff, 2007–2011
 General Michael Hagee, USMC, Commandant of the U.S. Marine Corps, 2003–2006

U.S. Army 
 General Stanley McChrystal, USA, Commander, International Security Assistance Force/United States Forces Afghanistan, 2009–2010
 General John Shalikashvili, USA, Chairman of the Joint Chiefs of Staff, 1993–1997
 General Raymond T. Odierno, USA, Chief of Staff of the U.S. Army, 2011–2015
 Lieutenant General Michael Flynn, USA, Director of the Defense Intelligence Agency, 2012–2014
 General Mark A. Milley, USA, Chairman of the Joint Chiefs of Staff, 2019–present

U.S. Air Force 
 General Bruce Carlson, USAF, Commander, Air Force Materiel Command, 2005–2008
 General John D. W. Corley, USAF, Commander, Air Combat Command, 2007–2009
 General Charles A. Gabriel, USAF, Chief of Staff of the U.S. Air Force, 1982–1986
 General John A. Gordon, USAF, Deputy Director, Central Intelligence Agency, 1997–2000
 General Richard E. Hawley, USAF, Commander, Air Combat Command, 1996–1999
 General C. Robert Kehler, USAF, Commander, Air Force Space Command, 2007–2011; Commander, U.S. Strategic Command, 2011–2013
 General Robert C. Oaks, USAF, Commander, Tactical Air Command, 1984–1985
 General Jerome F. O'Malley, USAF, Commander, United States Air Forces in Europe, 1990–1994

U.S. Space Force 
 General John W. Raymond, USSF, Chief of Space Operations, 2019–2022

U.S. Foreign Service 
 Ambassador Christopher R. Hill, U.S. Ambassador to Iraq, 2009–2010; Assistant Secretary of State for East Asian and Pacific Affairs, 2005–2009
 Ambassador James B. Smith, U.S. Ambassador to Saudi Arabia, 2009–2013
 Department of State Special Agent Bryce Frederick, U.S. DS Special Agent, 2019–2021

U.S. Civil Service 
 Kat Cammack, U.S. Representative, Florida's 3rd congressional district, 2021-
 Frank Jimenez, former General Counsel, U.S. Department of the Navy, 2006–2009
 Hugo Teufel III, 2nd Chief Privacy Officer, Department of Homeland Security in the Government of the United States, 2006–2009
 Sean Spicer, 30th White House Press Secretary, 2017–2017

Notable international graduates
 Vice Admiral Zahir Uddin Ahmed, Chief of Naval Staff, Bangladesh Navy, 2009–2013
 Vice Admiral Tomás Gomez Arroyo Spanish Navy, 1972–1973.
 Admiral Panagiotis Chinofotis, Chief of the Hellenic National Defense General Staff, 2005–?.
 Rear Admiral Benjamin Ohene-Kwapong Chief of the Naval Staff, Ghana Navy, 1985–1990.
 Admiral Arun Prakash, Chief of the Naval Staff, Indian Navy, and Chairman of the Chiefs of Staff Committee, India, 2004–2006.
 Vice Admiral Mohammed Farid Habib, Chief of Naval Staff, Bangladesh Navy, 2013–current
 Vice Admiral Kamal Habibollahi, Last Commander of the Imperial Iranian Navy 1975–1979.
 Rear-Admiral Lai Chung Han, Chief of the Republic of Singapore Navy, 2014–Present.
 Admiral Devendra Kumar Joshi, Chief of the Naval Staff, Indian Navy, 2012–2014.
 President Émile Lahoud, 15th President of Lebanon from November 1998 to November 2007.
 Admiral Radhakrishna Hariram Tahiliani, Chief of the Naval Staff, Indian Navy, 1984–1987.
 Vice Admiral Mateo M Mayuga AFP Flag Officer In Command, Philippine Navy 09 Dec 10 - 09 Dec 07
 Vice Admiral Mark Mellett, Chief of Staff of Defence Forces Ireland 2015–2021
 Admiral Nirmal Kumar Verma, Chief of the Naval Staff, Indian Navy, 2009–2012.
 Admiral Thisara Samarasinghe, Commander, Sri Lankan Navy (2009–2011) and Sri Lankan High Commissioner to Australia.
 Vice Admiral Russ Shalders, Chief of Navy, Australia, 2005–2008.
 Rear Admiral Predrag Stipanović, Commander of Croatian Navy (2015–present)
 General Håkan Syrén, Supreme Commander of the Swedish Armed Forces, 2003–2009; Chairman, European Union Military Committee, 2009–?.
 Vice Admiral Ko Tun-hwa former Vice Minister of Defense, Republic of China and is currently the National Policy Advisor to the President of the Republic of China (Taiwan).
 King Tupou VI of Tonga, ʻAhoʻeitu ʻUnuakiʻotonga Tukuʻaho
 Rear Admiral Mohan Wijewickrama, Governor of Eastern Province and former chief of staff, Sri Lanka Navy
 Admiral Dato' Seri Panglima Ahmad Kamarulzaman, Chief of Navy, Royal Malaysian Navy, Nov 18, 2015 – present
 Vice Admiral Edmundo Nestor Martin Felix Pimentel, Chief of Navy, Dominican Republic, Feb 2014-Feb. 2016. Currently President of the National Directorate for Drug Control (DNCD).
 Vice Admiral Miguel E. Peña Acosta, Chief of Navy, Dominican Republic, Feb 2016–Present.
Rear Admiral Romulo Espaldon, first rear admiral of the Philippine Navy.
 Rear Admiral Sinsy Nghipandua second Namibian Navy Commander
 Vice Admiral Adeluis Bordado, Flag Officer in Command Philippine Navy

Notable faculty

Stephen E. Ambrose, historian and biographer
Edward L. Beach Jr., author of Run Silent, Run Deep, inaugural holder of the Stephen B. Luce Chair of Naval Science 
Yoram Dinstein (born 1936), Israeli President of Tel Aviv University
John B. Hattendorf, naval historian, Ernest J. King Professor of Maritime History
Alfred Thayer Mahan, historian, author of The Influence of Sea Power upon History
Jeffrey H. Norwitz, former John Nicholas Brown Chair of Counterterrorism
James R. Soley, naval historian and first civilian faculty member

See also

 National War College
 Industrial College of the Armed Forces
 Marine Corps War College
 Army War College
 USAF Air War College
 List of National Historic Landmarks in Rhode Island
 National Register of Historic Places listings in Newport County, Rhode Island
 International Seapower Symposium

References

External links
Naval War College